Bhupendranath Seth was an Indian politician belonging to All India Trinamool Congress. He was elected as MLA of Bongaon Vidhan Sabha Constituency in 1982, 1991 and 2006. He died on 20 May 2006 at the age of 72. His son Gopal Seth was elected as MLA of Bongaon Vidhan Sabha Constituency in 2009.

References

2006 deaths
Trinamool Congress politicians from West Bengal
West Bengal MLAs 1982–1987
West Bengal MLAs 1991–1996
West Bengal MLAs 2006–2011
1933 births
Year of birth uncertain